Hyperlais is a genus of moths of the family Crambidae.

Species
Hyperlais argillacealis Zeller, 1847
Hyperlais conspersalis Mey, 2011
Hyperlais cruzae (Agenjo, 1953)
Hyperlais dulcinalis (Treitschke, 1835)
Hyperlais glyceralis (Staudinger, 1859)
Hyperlais nemausalis (Duponchel, 1831-1833)
Hyperlais rivasalis (Vazquez, 1905)
Hyperlais rosseti Varenne, 2009
Hyperlais siccalis Guenée, 1854
Hyperlais squamosa (Hampson, 1913)
Hyperlais transversalis Mey, 2011
Hyperlais xanthomista Mey, 2011

References

Cybalomiinae
Crambidae genera